Ukrtelecom JSC (PFTS: UTLM) is Ukraine's monopolist  telephone company, also active in the ISP and mobile markets. The company was governed by the Ministry of Transportation and Communications of Ukraine with 92.9% shares belonging to the government until Austrian investment firm EPIC bought a 92.79 percent stake from the Ukrainian government for $1.3 billion. This stake was resold to System Capital Management of Ukrainian oligarch Rinat Akhmetov.

Ukrtelecom participates in ITUR, TEL/ТАЕ, and BSFOCS international cable systems. Until 1994, the company was known as Ukrelectrozvyazok.

History

The company was created from the Soviet network of communication only in 1993, however, the network itself came under the jurisdiction of the Ministry of Communications in 1991 after the dissolution of the Soviet Union. According to the company's history, the phone-telegraph communication network in Ukraine prior to 1991 was only sixth within the Soviet Union and was noticeably backward. All communications outside the Soviet Union was conducted through the Moscow's headquarters. In 1991 there were 7,630 thousands numbers listed, averaging 14.6 numbers for 100 residents.

In 1993, the government confirmed the complex program for creation the single national system of communication in Ukraine. For the purpose of more effective managing of the industry it was fully reorganized. Based on the government enterprises two main industrial unions were created: Ukrposhta and Ukrelektrozviazok. The latter was changed in 1994 to Ukrtelekom.

Ukrtelekom upon its creation consisted of seven enterprises and organizations: Ukrtek (Ukrainian enterprise of international and intercity communication and television), Kyiv telegraph, Kyiv city radio broadcasting network, Center of informational technologies, State Institutes "Ukrzviazokproekt", "Dniprozviazok", "Zakarpattelekom".

In January 1995 to Ukrtelekom were merged other 22 oblast networks as well as the Crimean republican and Sevastopol city communication enterprises. And by the end of the year "Ukrzviazoksuputnyk" was also added to the union. By January 1996 the union absorbed the last enterprise "Dniportelekom".

The union, however, was not as effective as it was thought it should have been and in 1998 Ukrtelekom was restructured to form a single entity out of the union of some 35 state enterprises. By the end of 1999 all the enterprises were reformed into stock associates of the Ukrtelekom company.

In 2009, Ukrtelecom introduced a new logo for the first time of 18 years since 1991, and were at the same time changing its corporate identity. It was reported that the rebranding cost an estimated $100,000 and was ordered in Britain.

The Ukrainian government planned to privatize the company as early as March 2009. On October 12, 2010, the first Azarov government announced the date and starting price for selling Ukrtelecom. Bidding took place on December 28, 2010, with the starting price of all government shares at ₴10.5 billion. Companies with over 25% of shares owned by government or government establishment were announced not eligible for the bidding. Also the companies whose market share in communications in the country exceeds 25% were announced non-eligible either.
The sole bidder at the auction was Ukrainian-registered ESU, a cellular network builder and subsidiary of EPIC Invest, an Austrian-based investment company, which offered to pay the starting price of ₴10.5 billion. ESU then sold this 92,79% stake in Ukrtelecom to System Capital Management of Ukrainian oligarch Rinat Akhmetov.

Post-privatisation
At their first annual general meeting, held on June 14, 2011, the new owners granted the board the right to sell Utel, Ukrtelecom's mobile division, within a half year. The shareholders also reshuffled the supervisory board, installing their representatives, and increased board responsibilities.

2022 Russian invasion 
Suring the invasion of Ukraine, Ukrtelecom lost an estimated 87% of Internet connectivity nationwide on March 28, 2022, due to Russian cyberattacks. Ukrtelecom engineers regained control, and full service was restored 15 hours later. A smaller Ukrainian ISP, Triolan, had been attacked earlier in the month.

Leaders
 Alexander Barinov - Chairman of JSC "Ukrtelecom" 2014–present
 Yuri Kurmaz - Director of JSC "Ukrtelecom" 2014–present
 Leonid Netudykhata - Chairman of the supervisory board of JSC "Ukrtelecom" 2013–present
 Victor Sennikov - Director of the Kyiv city directorate JSC "Ukrtelecom" 2010–present
 Anatoly Mashirenko - Director of the Kyiv oblasnogo branch of JSC "Ukrtelecom" 2013–present
 Viktor Klimenko - Director of the Crimean branch of JSC "Ukrtelecom" 2007–present
 Stuart Paul Reich - Member of the supervisory board of JSC "Ukrtelecom" 2013–present
 Lyudmila Pavlenko - Member of the supervisory board of JSC "Ukrtelecom" 2013–present
 Catherine Lapshin - Member of the supervisory board of JSC "Ukrtelecom" 2014–present
 Ilya Arkhipov - Member of the supervisory board of JSC "Ukrtelecom"  2013–present

See also
Internet in Ukraine
Ukrposhta

References

External links
  Ukrtelecom homepage 

Telecommunications companies of Ukraine
Ukrainian brands
Companies based in Kyiv
Internet in Ukraine
Government-owned companies of Ukraine